Niederauer is a surname. Notable people with the surname include:

Brandon Niederauer (born 2003), American guitarist and actor
Duncan L. Niederauer, American businessman
George Hugh Niederauer (1936–2017), American Roman Catholic bishop